Live at Jodrell Bank is a live album and DVD released by Elbow on 25 November 2013 through Fiction Records.

Track listing

References

2013 albums
Jodrell Bank Observatory